There have been four baronetcies created for persons with the surname Clark (as distinct from Clarke, Clerk and Clerke), all in the Baronetage of the United Kingdom. Two of the creations are extant as of 2010.

The Clark Baronetcy, of St George's Hanover Square, London, was created in the Baronetage of the United Kingdom on 11 November 1837 for James Clark, Physician to the Royal Household. The title became extinct on the death of the second Baronet in 1910.

The Clark Baronetcy, of Cavendish Square, London, was created in the Baronetage of the United Kingdom on 9 August 1883 for Andrew Clark, in recognition of his services to medical science. The title became extinct on the death of the third Baronet, a Queen's Counsel, in 1979.

The Clark Baronetcy, of Melville Crescent, Edinburgh in the County of Midlothian, was created in the Baronetage of the United Kingdom on 28 September 1886 for Thomas Clark, Lord Provost of Edinburgh between 1885 and 1888. Henry James Douglas Clark (1888–1978), second son of the second Baronet, was a Brigadier in the 1st Battalion of the Argyll and Sutherland Highlanders.

The Clark Baronetcy, of Dunlambert in the City of Belfast, was created in the Baronetage of the United Kingdom on 6 July 1917 for the businessman and politician George Clark. The third Baronet was a member of the Parliament of Northern Ireland for Belfast Dock.

Clark baronets, of St George's Hanover Square (1837)
Sir James Clark, 1st Baronet (1788–1870)
Sir John Forbes Clark, 2nd Baronet (1821–1910)

Clark baronets, of Cavendish Square (1883)
Sir Andrew Clark, 1st Baronet (1826–1893)
Sir James Richardson Andrew Clark, 2nd Baronet (1852–1948)
Sir Andrew Edmund James Clark, 3rd Baronet (1898–1979)

Clark baronets, of Melville Crescent, Edinburgh (1886)

Sir Thomas Clark, 1st Baronet FRSE (1823–1900)
Sir John Maurice Clark, 2nd Baronet (1859–1924)
Sir Thomas Clark, 3rd Baronet FRSE (1886–1977)
Sir John Douglas Clark, 4th Baronet (1923–1991)
Sir Francis Drake Clark, 5th Baronet (1924–2019)
Sir Edward Drake Clark, 6th Baronet (born 1966)

Clark baronets, of Dunlambert (1917)
Sir George Smith Clark, 1st Baronet (1861–1935)
Sir George Ernest Clark, 2nd Baronet (1882–1950)
Sir George Anthony Clark, 3rd Baronet (1914–1991)
Sir Colin Douglas Clark, 4th Baronet (1918–1995)
Sir Jonathan George Clark, 5th Baronet (born 1947)

The heir apparent is the present holder's only son Simon George Gray Clark (born 1975).

See also
 Clarke baronets
 Clerk baronets
 Clerke baronets
 Clerk family

Notes

References

External links
Obituary of Sir James Clark, 1st Baronet.

Baronetcies in the Baronetage of the United Kingdom
Extinct baronetcies in the Baronetage of the United Kingdom